Jan Šedivý (born 1984) is a Czech orienteering competitor and world champion, born in Prague. He won a gold medal in the relay at the 2012 World Orienteering Championships in Lausanne, together with Tomáš Dlabaja and Jan Procházka.

References

External links
 
 

1984 births
Living people
Czech orienteers
Male orienteers
Foot orienteers
World Orienteering Championships medalists
Competitors at the 2009 World Games
Sportspeople from Prague
Junior World Orienteering Championships medalists